The Garhwal Brigade was an infantry brigade of the British Indian Army formed in 1902 as a result of the Kitchener Reforms.  It was mobilized as 20th (Garhwal) Brigade at the outbreak of the First World War as part of the 7th (Meerut) Division and departed for France.  It served on the Western Front until November 1915.  It then moved to Egypt where it joined the 10th Indian Division, by now designated as 20th Indian Brigade.  It left the division in March 1916 and thereafter served as an independent brigade in the Sinai and Palestine Campaign.  It was broken up in 1920.

History
The Kitchener Reforms, carried out during Lord Kitchener's tenure as Commander-in-Chief, India (1902–09), completed the unification of the three former Presidency armies, the Punjab Frontier Force, the Hyderabad Contingent and other local forces into one Indian Army.  Kitchener identified the Indian Army's main task as the defence of the North-West Frontier against foreign aggression (particularly Russian expansion into Afghanistan) with internal security relegated to a secondary role.  The Army was organized into divisions and brigades that would act as field formations but also included internal security troops.

The Garhwal Brigade was formed in November 1902 as a result of the Kitchener Reforms.  The brigade formed part of the 7th (Meerut) Division.

Western Front
At the outbreak of the First World War, the Garhwal Brigade was still part of the 7th (Meerut) Division.  It was mobilized with the division in August 1914 as the 20th (Garhwal) Brigade and sailed from Bombay on 20 September for the Western Front.  It arrived in Marseilles on 12 – 14 October and moved up to the Front, entering the line on the night of 30/31 Octobertaking part in the Battle of La Bassée (10 October – 2 November).  While in France, the brigade was known by its geographical rather than numerical designation so as to avoid confusion with the British 20th Brigade also serving on the Western Front at the same time.  The brigade served with the division as part of the Indian Corps on the Western Front until the end of 1915.

For the rest of 1914, the brigade took part in the Defence of Festubert (23 – 24 November) and the Defence of Givenchy (20 – 21 December).  In the former, Naik Darwan Singh Negi of the 1st Battalion, 39th Garhwal Rifles won the Victoria Cross (VC), the highest and most prestigious award for gallantry in the face of the enemy that can be awarded to British and Commonwealth forces.  Indian troops only became eligible for the award in 1911.  His award was gazetted on the same date as that of Sepoy Khudadad Khan, the first Indian VC winner.

In 1915, the brigade took part in the Battle of Neuve Chapelle (10 – 13 March) where another two VCs were won: Rifleman Gabar Singh Negi (posthumous) of the 2nd Battalion, 39th Garhwal Rifles, and Private William Buckingham of the 2nd Battalion, Leicestershire Regiment.  The brigade then took part in the battles of Aubers (9 May), Festubert (15 – 25 May) and Loos (25 September – 8 October) where Rifleman Kulbir Thapa of the 2nd Battalion, 3rd Queen Alexandra's Own Gurkha Rifles won the brigade's fourth VC.

The losses suffered by the Indian Corps could not be adequately replaced as the reserve and replacement system essentially broke down.  Consequently, on 31 October 1915 orders were received to transfer the 3rd (Lahore) and 7th (Meerut) Divisions to Mesopotamia.  The last elements were relieved by 9 November and departed for Egypt en route to Mesopotamia.  While in Egypt, the brigade left 7th (Meerut) Division in December 1915 and was replaced by 28th Indian Brigade.

Egypt and Palestine
The 10th Indian Division was re-formed on 7 January 1916 as part of the Suez Canal Defences with units and formations in Egypt: the 20th (Garwhal) Brigadeby now designated as 20th Indian Brigadejoined the division along with the 29th Indian Brigade returned from Gallipoli and 31st Indian Brigade formerly with 11th Indian Division.  The new division was short lived: it was broken up again on 7 March 1916 as the need to reform depleted units from France made this plan unrealistic.  The brigade became an independent formation and served as such for the rest of the war in the Sinai and Palestine Campaign.

The brigade continued to serve on the Suez Canal Defences under command of the Egyptian Expeditionary Force in 1916 and 1917.  In April 1918, it was attached to the Desert Mounted Corps and with it took part in the Second Transjordan attack (30 April – 4 May 1918).  Two battalions of the brigadeAlwar Infantry (I.S.) and 1st Battalion, Patiala Infantry (I.S.)were involved in the Battle of Abu Tulul on 15 July.  It then helped to occupy the Jordan Valley.  In August 1918, the brigade joined Chaytor's Force along with the Anzac Mounted Division and other units under the command of Major-General E.W.C. Chaytor.  As part of the Final Offensive in Palestine, the Force operated in the Jordan Valley and hills to the east of the Jordan.  It took part in the Third Transjordan attack (19 – 25 September) leading to the capture of Amman (25 September).

The brigade was broken up in 1920.

Orders of battle

Commanders
The Garhwal Brigade / 20th (Garhwal) Brigade / 20th Indian Brigade had the following commanders:

See also

 Garhwal Brigade formed in India to replace the original brigade when it was mobilized 
 Indian Expeditionary Force A

Notes

References

Bibliography

External links
 
 

Brigades of India in World War I
Military units and formations established in 1902
Military units and formations disestablished in 1920